Balizia is a genus of flowering plants in the family Fabaceae. It belongs to the mimosoid clade of the subfamily Caesalpinioideae.

Etymology
Balizia is a taxonomic anagram derived from the name of the confamilial genus Albizia. The latter name is a taxonomic patronym honoring the Italian nobleman Filippo degli Albizzi, who introduced Albizia julibrissin to Europe in the mid-18th century.

References

Mimosoids
Fabaceae genera
Taxa named by James Walter Grimes
Taxa named by Rupert Charles Barneby